Asadabad, also called Chaghasarai, is the capital city of Kunar Province in Afghanistan. It is located in the eastern-northeastern portion of the country. The city is located within a valley at the confluence of the Pech River and Kunar River between two mountain ridgelines running along both sides of the valley from Northeast to Southwest.

Asadabad is in a mountainous region of the Hindu Kush mountains about 13 km (eight miles) northwest of the Pakistani border and 80 km (50 miles) northeast of Jalalabad, Afghanistan. Asadabad deals with a moderate amount of trade goods. Nawa Pass, that lies about 16 km (10 miles) south of Asadabad, is the next major border crossing point north of the Khyber Pass for the region. The pass is under constant observation due to its relative ease to cross for commerce and its potential usage for smuggling and Taliban insurgents.

On 14 August 2021, Asadabad was seized by Taliban fighters, becoming the twenty-first provincial capital to be captured by the Taliban as part of the wider 2021 Taliban offensive.

History 

The surrounding Kunar Province lies near the historic routes connecting Central Asia, India, and Iran, such as the Silk Road and the Grand Trunk Road through the Khyber Pass, as well as routes through the Hindu Kush mountains. Asadabad lies at the confluence of the two major rivers of the area, the Kunar and the Pech. The region would have come under the borders of various empires of the ages, including the Achaemenid Persians, the Greco-Bactrian Kingdom, etc. It was very close to the paths Alexander the Great passed by on his way from conquering Persia to invading India. Asadabad is also on the eastern boundary of what was Kafiristan - part of Afghanistan not converted to Islam until the 1890s.

In the past, the area near Asadabad was called "Chagha Sarai", with various spellings (Chaga Serai, Chagasaray, Chigur Serai, Chughansuraee).

Emperor Babur (late 15th century/early 16th century) claims to have taken over the town as part of his military campaigns in the area. He describes it very briefly in his book, Baburnama. He also mentions relations with the Kaffirs, whom he claims helped defend the town against him.

In the late 19th century/early 20th century the capital of the region was moved from Pushoot/Pasat/Pasad to the present Asadabad location. Over the 20th century, various technical improvements were made such as roads, a shopping area, schools, a bridge, a gas station, etc.

Soviet Afghan war
In the opening times of the Soviet Afghan war (1979-1988), Kunar province saw some of the first rebellions against the communist People's Democratic Party of Afghanistan. As punishment, PDPA troops with Soviet advisors massacred the males of the nearby village of Kerala, burying their bodies in a field near the Pech river. Asadabad was later linked to a Soviet military base during the war, which included Spetsnaz. Several Russian websites, like http://asadabad.ru, contain discussions and photos regarding this era.

In January 1979, a large guerrilla force, reported by the contemporary press - estimated - at 5,000 strong, attempted to capture the town, which was the headquarters of the Afghan Army's 9th Division.

In 1985, in the Battle of Maravar Pass the Afghan Mujahideen killed 31 Soviet troops in an ambush.

Mujahideen control
The rebel Mujahideen later took over the town from the Soviets. Gulbuddin Hekmatyar's Hizb-e-Islami, one of the Peshawar Seven groups, had heavy influence in the area. Osama bin Laden also spent time in Asadabad.

On 20 April 1991, the marketplace of Asadabad was hit by two Scud missiles, that killed 300 and wounded 500 inhabitants. Though the exact toll is unknown, these attacks resulted in heavy civilian casualties. The explosions destroyed the headquarters of Islamic leader Jamil al-Rahman, and killed a number of his followers.

2001-2021 war
In 2001 the War on Terror began with the invasion of Afghanistan, including Kunar Province. Forward Operating Base Camp Wright was set up a few kilometres south of Asadabad. According to an Army article, the camp was originally built by the Soviets.
The city was captured by the Taliban on 14 August 2021, as part of the wider 2021 Taliban offensive.

Climate
Asadabad has a hot-summer mediterranean climate (Csa), bordering on a humid subtropical climate (Cfa) under the Köppen climate classification system. About  of precipitation falls annually.

Economy 

About 10% - 15% of the valley surrounding Asadabad is used for agriculture by using an ancient land development technique called terracing. However, flooding and erosion have been an issue in the past. The primary crops are wheat, rice, sugarcane and vegetables. Multiple international agencies are assisting with these issues and other issues throughout the province.

As of January 2009, growth around Asadabad has been substantial. Examples of development are:
 Kunar province's main marketplace now has more than 600 stores, up from 100 just three years ago.
 Provincial Reconstruction Teams (PRTs) have constructed 16 schools, 20 medical clinics, and 8 district centers.
 PRTs completed construction on 13 roads and 11 bridges.
 Agribusiness Developmental Teams (ADTs) have several evolving projects and over 10 demonstration farms.
 Jalalabad-Asmar and Pech River roads have cut travel times in half and connected Asadabad centers of commerce with Jalabad.

Law enforcement

The Afghan National Police provide security for the city and district. There is also the International Security Assistance Force (ISAF), led by the United States armed forces. It is not only helping the Afghan government to develop the area but is also training the Afghan National Security Forces (ANSF), including the Afghan Border Police and the Afghan Armed Forces.

Sport
The Kunar Cricket Ground opened in 2018 and has played host to first-class cricket matches in the Ahmad Shah Abdali 4-day Tournament and the Mirwais Nika Provincial 3-Day Tournament. The ground is most notable for a match between Kabul Region and Boost Region in the 2018 Ahmad Shah Abdali 4-day Tournament, when Kabul batsman Shafiqullah scored the fastest double century in first-class cricket. He scored 200 not out from 89 balls, and also scored the most sixes in a first-class match, with 24.

Notable residents and incidents
U.S. Navy Lieutenant Michael P. Murphy was posthumously awarded the Medal of Honor for his actions during Operation Red Wings, which took place in the mountainous terrain near Asadabad from June to July 2005.
US Operations: "Big East Wind" and Operation Mountain Lion
A man named Abdul Wali was tortured to death by CIA contractor David Passaro at the nearby US military base in 2003. Wali had brought himself in for questioning regarding the rocket attacks on the base, at the suggestion of the provincial governor, who told him he wouldn't be harmed. Passaro was later convicted of assault after 82nd Airborne Division troops testified against him. He received 8+ years in prison.

Sister cities
  Union City, California, United States

Gallery

References

External links

ASADĀBĀD - Encyclopedia Iranica
Asadabad.ru, an entire Russian website devoted to the veterans of the 334th from the Soviet Afghan war
Vlasenko Map i-42-12, a highly detailed old Russian map of the area

Populated places in Kunar Province
Provincial capitals in Afghanistan